Jim C. Hines (born April 15, 1974) is an American fantasy and science fiction writer.

Life and work
Hines was a volunteer crisis counselor in East Lansing and worked as the Male Outreach Coordinator for the MSU Safe Place. In 2008, he donated his archive to the Science Fiction and Fantasy Writers of America (SFWA) Collection in the department of Rare Books and Special Collections at Northern Illinois University.  He has been the author guest of honor at multiple conventions, and was the Toastmaster for the 2014 NASFiC (North American Science Fiction Convention). He's also served as Toastmaster for Icon (Iowa science fiction convention) since 2012. He currently lives in Holt Michigan, where he works for state government.

He is the author of one non-fantasy novel, Goldfish Dreams, described on the author's website as a "mainstream rape-awareness novel".  He is the author of the Jig the Goblin fantasy trilogy, comprising Goblin Quest, Goblin Hero and Goblin War. He also edited the anthology Heroes in Training with Martin H. Greenberg. He is published by DAW Books, and his most recent books have appeared on the Locus Bestseller list.

Hines' literary works have been recognized and highlighted at Michigan State University in their Michigan Writers Series. He was a first-place winner of the L. Ron Hubbard Writers of the Future Award in 1998 with his story "Blade of the Bunny".

In 2012, he won the Hugo Award for Best Fan Writer.

"Striking a Pose" 
In January 2012, Hines posted on his blog with the headline "Striking a Pose (Women and Fantasy Covers)", a discussion triggered by some of the poses in which female characters are drawn on the covers of books in his Princess Series. Hines attempted to mirror some of these anatomically incorrect poses on the covers of one of his own works and those of a variety of other fantasists. The resulting discussion continued, in such venues as Jezebel.com. Hines has participated in several panel discussions at science fiction conventions such as one at the feminist convention WisCon, where a group of women including a gymnast and a dancer attempted (with limited success) to recreate such poses; and in a posing competition (benefits to charity) with fellow Hugo-winner John Scalzi, which has brought the discussion and others like it such as The Hawkeye Initiative to the attention of Boing Boing and other publications, including political blogs like ThinkProgress.

Bibliography

The Goblin Quest Series 
 Goblin Quest  (2006) DAW Jig is a scrawny little nearsighted goblin-a runt even among his puny species. Captured by a party of adventurers searching for a magical artifact, and forced to guide them, Jig encounters every peril ever faced on a fantasy quest.
 Goblin Hero  (2007) DAW After barely surviving an adventure he never wanted, the scrawny little nearsighted goblin called Jig is now known as Jig Dragonslayer, and has the power of healing, thanks to the forgotten god he worships. But being a hero isn't all it's cracked up to be. Not when the goblin leader wants him dead, and everyone else actually expects him to keep doing heroic-and incredibly dangerous-things.
 Goblin War  (2008) DAW The goblin lair is once again under attack by the humans, and when they gain control of the lair they take out the strongest goblins, including the famous Jig the Dragonslayer. It seems that there is a war going on, pitting humans against an army of monsters - orcs, goblins and kobolds. However, Jig quickly discovers that he and his tribe have no friends on either side. Jig is going to have to use all of his brains and luck if he is going to keep himself alive...oh, and save his tribe as well, if at all possible.
 Goblin Tales  (2011) 	A vengeful ghost trapped in a goblin's ear ... a flaming spider who must help stop a goddess from conquering a science fiction convention ... a goblin nursery worker who finds herself trapped in the middle of a war. This self-published collection features five humorous short stories that explore the fantasy realm from the perspective of the lowest of the low, the unlikeliest of unheroes: the goblins.

Princess Series 
 The Stepsister Scheme  (2009) DAW Danielle De Glas, aka Princess Whiteshore, aka Cinderella, is having a hard time adjusting to palace life. She loves her prince, Armand, but going from the life of a slave to that of princess is not easy. To complicate matters, three months after her wedding, Danielle is attacked by her stepsister, Charlotte. The assassination attempt fails, but Charlotte escapes - after telling Danielle she will never see her beloved Armand again. This is the set up. Danielle, along with two other princesses (Snow White and Talia, aka Sleeping Beauty), must rescue her prince. Along the way, the true histories of all three princesses are revealed, vs. the "tales" circulating about them.
The Mermaid's Madness  (2009) DAW Princess Danielle on a mission of diplomacy with Queen Beatrice, their yearly tithe and renewal of peace with the merfolk, who prefer to be called undine. Since the undine are usually a matriarchal culture, it makes sense for the Princess and Queen to take the lead. Unfortunately, things go very wrong, very quickly. For instead of the King they are expecting, they are greeted by his mad daughter, Lirea, wronged by her human lover and looking for vengeance against all humans. In the ensuing conflict, Queen Beatrice is grievously injured. This leaves Danielle and her friends Talia and Snow to find both a cure for her ailment, and to find a way to stop Lirea from making war against their kingdom - and all of humanity.
 Red Hood's Revenge (2010) DAW Roudette's story was a simple one. A red cape. A wolf. A hunter. Her mother told her she would be safe, so long as she kept to the path. But sometimes the path leads to dark places. Roudette is the hunter now, an assassin known throughout the world as the Lady of the Red Hood. Her mission will take her to the country of Arathea and an ancient fairy threat. At the heart of the conflict between humans and fairies stands the woman Roudette has been hired to kill, the only human ever to have fought the Lady of the Red Hood and survived-the princess known as Sleeping Beauty.
 The Snow Queen's Shadow (2011) DAW When a spell gone wrong shatters Snow White's enchanted mirror, a demon escapes into the world. The demon's magic distorts the vision of all it touches, showing them only ugliness and hate. It is a power that turns even friends and lovers into mortal foes, one that will threaten humans and fairies alike.

Magic ex Libris Series 
 Libriomancer (2012)  DAW
 Codex Born (2013)  DAW 
 Unbound (2015)  DAW
 Revisionary (2016) DAW
 Imprinted: a Magic ex Libris Novelette (2018)

Janitors of the Post-Apocalypse Series 
 Terminal Alliance (2017) DAW
 Terminal Uprising (2019) DAW
 Terminal Peace (2022) DAW

Stand-alone works 

 Goldfish Dreams  (2003) Regal Crest Enterprises
 Fable: Blood of Heroes  (2015) Del Rey
 Tamora Carter: Goblin Queen  (2020)

Collections 
 The Goblin Master's Grimoire (2013)  ISFiC

Edited works 
 Heroes in Training (with Martin H. Greenberg), DAW (2007)
 Invisible  (2014)
 Invisible 2  (2015)
 Invisible 3 (with Mary Anne Mohanraj) (2017)

References

External links

 Jim C. Hines Homepage

1974 births
Living people
21st-century American novelists
American fantasy writers
American male novelists
Hugo Award-winning fan writers
Michigan State University alumni
Novelists from Pennsylvania
People from Holt, Michigan
21st-century American male writers